David E. Litvack (born April 25, 1972) is a former Democratic member of the Utah State House of Representatives, who represented the state's 26th house district in central Salt Lake City and part of West Valley City, from 2000 through 2012. He was the minority leader in the Utah House.

Early years
Litvack was born in Minneapolis, Minnesota.

Education
Litvack obtained his BS in psychology/sociology from Westminster College in 1994 where he is also a current Alumni Board member. He obtained his MA in social sciences from the University of Chicago in 1996.

Religion
David Litvack is Jewish.

Family
Litvack and his wife Erin have two children named Gabriel and Addison and they currently reside in Salt Lake City.

See also
 List of Utah State Legislatures
 Utah Democratic Party

References

External links
Utah House of Representatives – David Litvack official UT House profile
Project Vote Smart – David E. Litvack profile
Follow the Money – David Litvack
2006 2004 2002 2000 campaign contributions

1972 births
Living people
Westminster College (Utah) alumni
University of Chicago alumni
Jewish American state legislators in Utah
Democratic Party members of the Utah House of Representatives
Politicians from Salt Lake City
21st-century American politicians
21st-century American Jews